Young People may refer to:
 Young People (1937 Japanese film)
 Young People (1940 film), a 1940 American film
 Young People (1961 film), a 1961 Mexican film
 Young People (1972 film), a 1972 Hong Kong film